Provincial Highway 25 is a Taiwanese highway that starts from Fengshan and ends in Linyuan, both in Kaohsiung City. The highway is also known as Fenglin Highway (鳳林公路).

See also
 Highway system in Taiwan

References

External links

Highways in Taiwan